Kaikorai Valley College is a large co-educational secondary school in Dunedin, New Zealand. Initially starting as Kaikorai Valley High School in 1958, the school combined with Kenmure Intermediate School in 1996 to become Kaikorai Valley College,. It celebrated its 50th jubilee in 2008.

The college has approximately 65 international students, and has sister school relationships with Sakuragaoka High School, Kun-ei Girls High School and Myojo Gakuen in Japan; Po Leung Kuk Ngan Po Ling College in Hong Kong; and Harbin Number 13 Middle School in China.

Facilities include its own theatre and dance studio. The college had continual improvements to facilities with new computer suites, well equipped science laboratories, a new full sized gymnasium and open plan design and technology areas. Furthermore, the brand new administration block was opened by John Key in 2012. The school also has a disabled and special needs unit.

The school has its own radio show on Otago Access Radio.

Pupils of Kaikorai Valley College use the adjacent Kaikorai Stream for outdoor education, studying water quality and flow, learning fly fishing and monitoring waste water.

Alumni

Professor Richard Blaikie – Deputy Vice Chancellor Otago University 
Howard Broad – former New Zealand Commissioner of Police 2006 – 2011.
Shayne Carter, singer and songwriter for Straitjacket Fits and Dimmer
Robert Sarkies film director
Clayton Weatherston, dux in 1993, former University of Otago economics tutor and convicted murderer.

References

External links
Official website

Educational institutions established in 1958
Secondary schools in Dunedin
1958 establishments in New Zealand
Association of Community Access Broadcasters